Forbidden Paradise 7: Deep Forest is the seventh album in the Forbidden Paradise series. It is the fifth and last album in the series to be mixed by trance producer Tiësto. As with the rest of the Forbidden Paradise series, the album is a live turntable mix.

Track listing
 Limited Growth - "No Fate" [Quadran Remix] – 4:02
 Stef &  Vincent De Moor - "Details" – 5:39
 Angelo - "Funkdamental" [Dos Deviants Deadly Dub] – 6:14
 Steve Baltes - "My Style" – 4:09
 Carlos - "Ammenekoejoen" – 4:23
 Three Drives - "Greece 2000" – 4:58
 Cascade - "Transcend" – 3:55
 Moonman - "First Light" – 5:06
 Sirenal - "Wasteland" – 4:09
 Taucher - "Atlantis (Phase III)" – 6:26
 Hammock Brothers - "Meladonic" – 3:29
 Energy Source - "Everlasting Fire" – 4:11
 Paul van Dyk - "Words" – 5:11
 Pedro & Benno - "Spaced Entrance" – 2:54
 Trancefixion - "The Face" [In Heaven Mix] – 3:05
 Sosa - "The Wave" [DJ Taucher Remix] – 5:50

1998 compilation albums
Tiësto compilation albums